N93 may refer to:
 N93 (Long Island bus)
 N93 (Netherlands), a road
 Escadrille N.93, a unit of the French Air Force
 , a submarine of the Royal Navy
 Nokia N93, a mobile phone